Roszkowo  is a village in an administrative district of Gmina Czempiń, within Kościan County, Greater Poland Voivodeship, in west-central Poland.

References

Villages in Kościan County